Get It Now may refer to:

Get-It-Now!, a Wisconsin, U.S., division of Rent-A-Center
"Get It Now", a song by Amanda Blank